Neuro is a cyberpunk first-person shooter video game developed by Revolt Games and published by Russobit-M. It was released on 10 March 2006. 

The game's plot and world is tech-noir and cyberpunk-themed, as well as dystopian, with inspiration drawn from Blade Runner and Akira, and the works of writers such as William Gibson and Philip K. Dick.

Plot 
Neuro is a low-key crime drama with a cyberpunk theme and backdrop that philosophizes on the devolution of humankind: Even though  humans have spread themselves out amongst the stars and developed technology to improve and enrich their lives, they are still likely to exploit each other whenever possible. James Gravesen is a law officer who is attempting to arrest an elusive smuggler with government connections, Ramone, who is dealing in "Lilac Death," a highly dangerous weaponized substance that can "wipe out Sorgo three times".  James has biotechnology implanted in his brain that gives him a handful of psi-weapons: From 30 feet away and only using his mind, he can light enemies on fire, blow them off their feet and crush them, and make them go berserk and kill their allies. He can also see through walls to identify where enemies lurk, and he can heal himself. All of this takes a psi-energy which depletes with each use but resets over time. The enemies are mostly crooks trying to stop you from completing your various missions.

History 
Prior to release, Neuro had been in development since 2002 and was demonstrated at E3s 2003 and 2004. While intended for worldwide release, it was only released in Russia, the CIS (dubbed into Russian) and Taiwan (dubbed into English). In 2010, an academic, Keith Duffy, found out about Neuro and, not knowing about the official English-language release in Taiwan, translated it into English. His translation was released for free on his blog.

The Taiwanese release features a GFI Russia logo in the intro despite being distributed by Miracle Express, probably indicating that GFI would have been responsible for European and other Western distribution of the game.

References

External links 
 Neuro at IGN
 An interview with Irina Semenova, PR woman for Russobit M, on Neuro

2006 video games
Cyberpunk video games
First-person shooters
Video games developed in Russia
Windows games
Windows-only games
Russobit-M games
Single-player video games